Fatal Symphony (Italian: Sinfonia fatale) is a 1947 Italian war-melodrama film directed by Victor Stoloff and starring Douglass Montgomery, Marina Berti and Sarah Churchill. It was screened and awarded a prize at the Lugano Festival.

It was shot at the Scalera Studios in Rome. The film's sets were designed by the art directors Ottavio Scotti and Vittorio Valentini.

Synopsis
Before the Second World War an American composer, separated from his wife, comes to live in Italy and falls in love with a country girl.

Cast
 Douglass Montgomery as John Savage 
 Marina Berti as Mirella 
 Sarah Churchill as Mrs. Savage 
 Tullio Carminati as Pedro Diaz
 Victor Rietti as Beppo
 Carlo Romano as Giorgio
 John Blythe as pittore Pierre Robert
 Cesare Fantoni as sacerdote
 Pina Gallini as Nunziata, moglie di Beppo
 Claudio Gora as Rodolfo Marini
 Sergio Capogna as Rocco
 Renzo Merusi as tenore d'Errico
 Giuseppe Pierozzi as impiegato galleria d'arte
 Pina Piovani as  Lina, moglie di Pedro
 Kent Walton as Teddy Malone
 Guido Celano 
 Diego Pozzetto
 William Tubbs
 Nino Javert

References

Bibliography 
 Mary S. Lovell. The Churchills: In Love and War. W. W. Norton & Company, 2012.

External links 
 

1947 films
Italian drama films
Italian black-and-white films
1947 drama films
1940s Italian-language films
Films directed by Victor Stoloff
Films set in Rome
Films scored by Renzo Rossellini
1940s Italian films